Chuqi Sillani (Aymara chuqi gold, silla cane of maize, -ni a suffix, "the one with the golden cane of maize", also spelled Choque Sillani) is a  mountain in the Bolivian Andes. It is located in the La Paz Department, Loayza Province, Luribay Municipality. Chuqi Sillani lies southeast of Qillwan Quta and east of a plain named Qillwan Quta Pampa.

References 

Mountains of La Paz Department (Bolivia)